John Ward (February 14, 1767 – September 19, 1816) was the eleventh intendent (mayor) of Charleston, South Carolina, serving one term from 1801 to 1802.

Early life and education

Ward was born on February 14, 1767, to Joshua Ward and Sarah McCall. He was admitted to the South Carolina bar in 1787, married Mary Somersall in 1793, and then was elected intendant on September 14, 1801. Ward represented St. John's Parish (Colleton County) in the South Carolina State House during four General Assemblies, 1791–1797. Between 1798 and 1809, he represented the area in the South Carolina Senate.

Ward died on September 19, 1816, and is buried in Trinity Churchyard, New York City.

References

Mayors of Charleston, South Carolina
1767 births
1816 deaths
Place of birth missing
South Carolina state senators